Cratillus, son of Machatas ( Kratillos tou Machata) was a 3rd century BC gymnasiarch from the ancient city of Nikaia ond of the main settlements of the Illyrian tribe of the Bylliones.

Biography 
His name is mentioned once in an inscription found in Nikaia, modern Klos, Mallakastër. The inscription dates to the 3rd century BC. In this inscription Kratyllos bears the title of the gymnasiarch named, while his father's name (Machatas) is also mention in the same sentence:

A second-century inscription was found in the Oropos, central Greece, where a young man from the city of Nikaia was the first to be listed among the winners of the  Amphiaraos festival. "It was also an honor for the city gymnasium, where the champion was prepared."

See also 
 Illyria
 Illyrians
 Illyrian kingdom
 Illyrian education
 Culture of ancient Illyria

References 

Illyrians